Shaft is a 2019 American action comedy film directed by Tim Story and written by Kenya Barris and Alex Barnow. The film stars Samuel L. Jackson, Jessie T. Usher, Regina Hall, and Richard Roundtree. It is the fifth film in the Shaft series and a direct sequel to the 2000 film with the same title.

The film was released theatrically in the United States on June 14, 2019, by Warner Bros. Pictures, and digitally in global markets on June 28, 2019, by Netflix. It received negative reviews from critics and underperformed at the box office.

Plot
In 1989, NYPD Detective John Shaft, his wife Maya, and their infant son JJ Shaft survive an assassination attempt by drug lord Pierro "Gordito" Carrera. Concerned that Shaft's lifestyle will put them in danger, Maya moves upstate, divorces Shaft, and raises JJ on her own. 

Twenty-five years later, Shaft has quit the NYPD to become a private investigator and JJ is a rookie FBI analyst and cybersecurity expert with a degree from MIT. After Karim, his childhood friend and ex-United States Army soldier, is said to have died because of a heroin overdose, JJ concludes he must have been murdered. JJ travels to Harlem to investigate Manuel, the drug dealer who sold the heroin that Karim allegedly bought, but is violently ejected from his property. While being treated for a minor injury in the hospital by doctor Sasha, JJ's other childhood friend and his unrequited crush, he shows her Karim's toxicology report. She notes that the amount of heroin in Karim's system would have killed him long before he could have taken that much by himself, suggesting that he was indeed murdered. With no other recourse, JJ turns to his father for aid. Shaft agrees to help after realizing that JJ's case may lead him to Gordito.

The two begin investigating together, but JJ's progressive white collar outlook on life clashes with Shaft's old-school street ways. After confronting Manuel, the Shafts investigate "Brothers Watching Brothers", the drug rehab clinic Karim helped founded with fellow ex-soldiers Cutworth, Williams and Dominguez. There they learn that Karim stopped going to rehab in favor of attending services at a mosque currently under suspicion by the FBI for terrorism.

Sasha accompanies JJ and Shaft to investigate the mosque, where they are removed from the premises after the imam notices JJ's FBI badge. After Shaft convinces JJ and Sasha to plan a dinner together, the two Shafts investigate a convenience store owned by a woman named Bennie Rodriguez who donated $500,000 to the mosque. Maya calls JJ to inform him that she is coming to New York City to meet a man for dinner; she is overheard and later followed by Shaft. The Shafts, each at separate restaurants, survive assassination attempts orchestrated by Bennie. Maya forces Shaft to kick JJ out of the investigation for his own safety.

JJ turns over the evidence they have gathered to the FBI, who arrest the mosque's imam. However, the media accuses the FBI of islamophobia, and JJ's boss Vietti fires him. JJ returns to Shaft and overhears a conversation about Gordito, leading him to believe that his father was stringing him along the entire time. While Shaft visits and reconciles with Maya, JJ and Sasha track down Bennie to an abandoned warehouse and learn that "Brothers Watching Brothers" is a front for a drug smuggling ring; Karim was killed by Cutworth when he threatened to blow the whistle on their operation. JJ gets discovered by the smugglers; Sasha is kidnapped while JJ is rescued by Shaft.

Shaft introduces JJ to his grandfather, John Shaft Sr, where they acquire more firepower, and Shaft Sr decides to accompany them in an assault on Gordito's penthouse. The Shafts kill the drug smugglers while JJ has an intense fight with Cutworth and kills him, avenging Karim's death. He rescues Sasha before being confronted at gunpoint by Gordito. Gordito attempts to shoot JJ to spite Shaft, but Shaft takes the bullet and shoots Gordito, causing him to crash through a window and fall to his death, before collapsing himself.

In the aftermath, Shaft recovers in hospital with Maya's support. At the insistence of Shaft Sr, JJ and Sasha kiss, and finally begin a relationship. Vietti soon offers JJ a promotion to field agent, but JJ turns it down, and joins his father and grandfather in their PI business. At the end, the three generations of Shafts walk away together.

Cast

 Samuel L. Jackson as John Shaft, a private investigator and ex-NYPD Detective, father of J.J. Shaft and son of John Shaft Sr
 Jessie T. Usher as J.J. Shaft, an FBI computer analyst, estranged son of John Shaft and grandson of John Shaft Sr, who he meets for the first time since he was a baby. Jordan Preston Carter portrays a young J.J.
 Regina Hall as Maya Babanikos, J.J.'s mother and John Shaft's ex-wife 
 Alexandra Shipp as Sasha Arias, medical doctor, JJ's female best friend and love interest. Nyah Marie Johnson portrays a young Sasha
 Matt Lauria as Major Gary Cutworth, Karim's partner in the rehab centre
 Titus Welliver as Special Agent Vietti, J.J.'s FBI boss
 Cliff "Method Man" Smith as Freddy P., acquaintance of John Shaft
 Richard Roundtree as John Shaft Sr, legendary private investigator, father of John Shaft, and grandfather of J.J. Shaft

Isaach de Bankolé portrays Pierro "Gordito" Carrera, a drug lord. Avan Jogia portrays Karim Hassan, J.J.'s male best friend, a recovering addict helping fellow returning soldiers. Joey Mekyten portrays a young Karim. Luna Lauren Vélez portrays Bennie Rodriguez, Gordito's money launderer.

In addition, Cutworth's criminal partners at the rehab center are played by Robbie Jones as Sergeant Keith Williams, and Aaron Dominguez as Staff Sergeant Eddie Dominguez (Bennie's cousin), with Leland Jones appearing as Maya's date Ron, while Baby and Sugar, J.J.'s new friends at the club, are played by Chivonne Michelle and Tashiana Washington, respectively. Adrienne C. Moore as Ms. Pepper the cab driver.

Production
On February 18, 2015, it was announced that New Line Cinema had acquired the rights to the Shaft franchise, featuring detective character John Shaft, and would develop a new film within the series, along with producer John Davis of Davis Entertainment. On July 28, 2015, it was reported that Kenya Barris and Alex Barnow would write the script for the new film, which would also be produced by Ira Napoliello, and on January 20, 2017, the studio hired Tim Story to direct. On August 18, 2017, Jessie T. Usher was cast to play the film's new lead, the son of Samuel L. Jackson's John Shaft II from the 2000 film, while Richard Roundtree and Jackson were set to reprise their previous franchise roles.

In October 2017, Netflix signed a deal with New Line Cinema to cover more than half of the film's $30 million budget in exchange for the rights, which allowed Netflix to release the film on its platform outside of the United States two weeks after the theatrical release in the U.S.

Filming began in February 2018, and wrapped up production in the early part of the year. The cast went back to re-shoot a few scenes in Atlanta in August 2018.

Release
Shaft was theatrically released in the United States on June 14, 2019, by Warner Bros. Netflix released it internationally on June 28, 2019.

Reception

Box office
Shaft was released alongside Men in Black: International, as well as the wider expansion of Late Night in the United States and Canada, and was initially projected to gross $17–20 million from 2,950 theaters in its opening weekend. However, after the film only brought in $2.7 million on its first official release day, which included $600,000 from Thursday night previews, projections were lowered to $7 million. The film went on to gross 21.3 million, grossing 8.3 million in its debut week and another $3.6 million in its second weekend.

Critical response

The website's critical consensus reads: "Decades removed from the original, this multi-generational Shaft struggles to keep its characters interesting -- or anything other than uncomfortably outdated." On Metacritic, the film has a weighted average score of 40 out of 100, based on 32 critics, indicating "mixed or average reviews". Audiences polled by CinemaScore gave the film a grade of "A" on an A+ to F scale, while those at PostTrak gave it an average 4 out of 5 stars and a 51% "definite recommend".

Writing for The A.V. Club, Ignatiy Vishnevetsky gave the film a C, writing, "With its groaner jokes and TV-pilot production values, the new film makes the last attempt at updating the character to contemporary action-hero tastes (in 2000's Shaft, directed by John Singleton) look downright old-school. And its identity crises go a lot deeper than the title it confusingly shares with two earlier films."

References

Notes

Footnotes

External links
 

2019 action comedy films
2019 crime action films
2019 crime thriller films
2019 action thriller films
American action comedy films
American crime action films
American crime thriller films
American action thriller films
American buddy cop films
Davis Entertainment films
Films directed by Tim Story
Films produced by John Davis
Films set in 1989
Films set in 2014
Films shot in Atlanta
Films with screenplays by Kenya Barris
New Line Cinema films
English-language Netflix original films
American sequel films
Shaft (franchise)
Warner Bros. films
2019 films
2010s English-language films
2010s American films
African-American films